The women's single sculls rowing event at the 2011 Pan American Games was held from October 16–18 at the Canoe & Rowing Course in Ciudad Guzman. The defending Pan American Games champion is Mayra González of Cuba.

Schedule
All times are Central Standard Time (UTC-6).

Results

Heat 1

Heat 2

Repechage

Final B

Final A

References

Women's rowing at the 2011 Pan American Games